Manish Gandhi is an Indian theatre director and stage, film and TV actor. In 2006, he worked with the Government of Chandigarh to create a new theatre education programme for children in government schools. In 2009, he was awarded a scholarship from the Inlaks Shivdasani, Foundation after which he completed a stint at FTII, Pune.

Theatre

In 2010, Gandhi played the lead role in Rizwaan, written and directed by Abhishek Majumdar. In 2011, he directed (and acted in) Mike Bartlett's Cock for the youth theatre festival, Thespo, where it picked up two awards. The Mumbai Theatre Guide said the play raises "important questions but isn't as provocative as the title would suggest" but "Gandhi displays some acuity as the director." Noted critic Shanta Gokhale said the play "acquires a dimension that lies outside a mere love triangle."

In 2012, he directed Vikram Phukan's Limbo, which opened at Prithvi Theatre after a crowd-sourcing campaign. The play has strong movement elements and Mumbai Theatre Guide wrote, "it has the unbounded freewheeling feel of an exploration." The Times of India said, "what makes it unique is the dance and music routine, which has lots of interesting movements."

In 2013 he directed reality star Eijaz Khan in an adaptation of Anton Chekhov.

Films
He acted in the film adaptation of Rizwaan by Deepti Khurana, which has done the rounds of international film festivals and won special jury mention at the 5th ViBGYOR Film Festival of Kerala.

Gandhi has shot for the film Chai Shai Biscuits, a quirky comedy about arranged marriages.

In 2018, along with actress Sayani Gupta, Manish Gandhi was cast in a short film The Proposal.

In 2020, Angrezi Medium as Advait

Television

References

1986 births
Living people
Indian male television actors
Indian theatre directors
Punjabi people
Male actors from Chandigarh